George Lowden (born 2 March 1933) is an English former professional footballer who played in the Football League for Brentford as a left back.

Career 
Lowden began his career as an amateur in the reserve team at Brentford and signed professionally for the club in 1953, after completing his National Service in Egypt. He made his debut in a 4–1 Second Division defeat to Doncaster Rovers on 10 September 1953. Lowden managed only 29 senior appearances for the Bees in eight years at Griffin Park, but made over 200 appearances for the reserve team and was developed as a centre half.

Career statistics

References

1933 births
Footballers from Isleworth
English footballers
Brentford F.C. players
English Football League players
Southern Football League players
Association football fullbacks
Hounslow F.C. players
Hillingdon Borough F.C. players
Living people